HMS Romulus was a 44-gun ship of the Royal Navy. She was captured by the French Navy in the Chesapeake Bay during the American Revolutionary War and taken into French service as Romulus. She was later razeed to become the frigate Résolution, and served in an exploration voyage to China under Bruni d'Entrecasteaux.

British career
HMS Romulus served under Captain George Gayton in the British squadron off America during the American Revolutionary War.

French career
Rear-Admiral Sochet-Destouches recommissioned Romulus under her old name in his squadron. In September 1781, she ferried troops to Annapolis for the Siege of Yorktown, in a division under Le Saige de La Villèsbrunne.

In 1784, Romulus was razeed into a frigate and renamed to Résolution. In 1786, she took part to an exploration voyage to China under Bruni d'Entrecasteaux, along with the corvette Subtile. The squadron reached Macao on 7 February 1787, two days after Lapérouse had left.

Fate 
In 1788, Résolution was decommissioned in Brest and in June 1789, she became a hulk at  Isle de France

Notes, citations, and references 
Notes

Citations

References
 

Ships of the line of the Royal Navy
Ships of the line of the French Navy
Captured ships
1777 ships
Ships built on the Beaulieu River